Rachid Amrane (born March 15, 1974 in Mostaganem) is an Algerian international footballer.

Honours
 Topscorer of the 1997 Arab Cup Winners' Cup with MC Oran with 6 goals
 Topscorer of the Qatar Stars League with Ittihad Doha in the 2001-02 season with 16 goals.
 Topscorer of the Algerian Ligue 2 with ASM Oran in the 2004-05 season with 20 goals.

Qadsia  Stats

References

1974 births
Living people
Algerian footballers
Algeria international footballers
MC Oran players
ES Sétif players
Expatriate footballers in Qatar
Al-Gharafa SC players
Expatriate footballers in Kuwait
People from Mostaganem
ASM Oran players
Qadsia SC players
Qatar Stars League players
ES Mostaganem players
Association football forwards
Kuwait Premier League players
CS Constantine players
Algerian expatriate sportspeople in Kuwait
Algerian expatriate sportspeople in Qatar
21st-century Algerian people